Alexarchus or Alexarch was an Ancient Macedonian scholar and officer, son of Antipater and brother of Cassander.  He lived around 350 to 290 BC.  He is mentioned as the founder of a utopian town called Ouranopolis, in Chalcidice.  Here he is said to have introduced a number of neologisms, which, though very expressive, appear to have been regarded as slang or pedantic.

Glossary

 aputes <caller> for keryx herald  (Attic ἠπύω êpuô, Doric and Arcadian apuô, call to)
 argyris <silver cup> for drachma
 brotokertes <mortal-shaver> for koureus barber
 hemerotrophis <daily-food> for choinix dry measure
 orthroboas <morning-shouter> for alektor, alektryon rooster

References

Sources

Ancient Greek grammarians
Linguists from Greece
Ancient Macedonian linguists
4th-century BC Macedonians
3rd-century BC Greek people
4th-century BC births
3rd-century BC deaths